Prajurit (also spelled Panjurit in Google Map) is an islet in Indonesia some  off the cost of Sumatra in the Sunda Strait.

The planned Sunda Strait Bridge will utilise the islet.

See also

 List of islands of Indonesia

References

Islands of the Sunda Strait